Clepsis assensiodes is a species of moth of the family Tortricidae. It is found in Ecuador (Pichincha-Septimo Paraiso Reserve).

The wingspan is about 13 mm. The ground colour of the forewings is creamy sprinkled with dark brown and suffused with grey in some parts. The markings are dark brown. The hindwings are creamy, but greyish brown from beyond the middle.

Etymology
The species name refers to the similarity with Clepsis assensus, plus odes (meaning shape).

References

Moths described in 2004
Clepsis